Luis Núñez (born October 11, 1964) is an athlete from the Dominican Republic who ran in the 1500m at the World Track and Field Championships in Tokyo, Japan in 1991. Luis Núñez also won two National Championships for the NCAA II in the 1500m indoors, in 1990 and 1991.

References

1964 births
Living people
Place of birth missing (living people)
Dominican Republic male middle-distance runners